John M. Mason, MBE (21 January 1940 – 22 January 2011) was a Scottish solicitor, musician, composer and conductor. He was the co-founder, musical director, and conductor of the Scottish Fiddle Orchestra from its creation in 1980 until his death in 2011.

Early life and education 
John M. Mason, MBE was born in Kirkwall, Scotland in 1940 to William and Tomima (Toza) Mason. He attended Kirkwall Grammar School, before moving to Wigtown with his family after the war. He then attended Douglas Ewert High School in Newton Stewart, and graduated from the University of Edinburgh with a law degree.

Both of Mason's parents were musicians, his father played the fiddle and his mother the piano, and he took up both instruments in childhood. Upon his father's insistence, he left his fiddle at home while attending University so he could focus entirely on his studies, but he picked it up again during the summer holidays. He joined the Mona Stewart Dance Band, and with them played at weddings and bookings all over southwest Scotland.

Career 
After his marriage in 1967, Mason moved to Troon, Scotland, where he took a position as a solicitor with Waddell & MacIntosh Solicitors. He was soon invited to join the Kilmarnock Caledonian Strathspey and Reel Society, and in 1972, he helped in the formation of the Ayr and Prestwick Strathspey and Reel Society, for which he served as conductor. Following this success, he co-founded the Scottish Fiddle Orchestra with fellow musician Gerry Crean in 1980 . He served as the musical director and principal conductor of the orchestra from its creation until his death in 2011. Under John's leadership, the orchestra played concerts all over the United Kingdom, as well as a handful of international tours, in order to raise money for various charities. Along with John's arrangements of traditional Scottish fiddle music, the orchestra continues to play many of John's original compositions, which numbered over 600.

In 1987, Mason received an MBE from Her Majesty the Queen for services to music.

Compositions 
Over his lifetime, Mason wrote more than 600 original compositions. Below are some of his compositions from recordings.

 The Arran Shepard
 Ceud Mile Failte
 Drumadoon
 The Dunlop Strathspey
 Father Eammon Gilmartin
 Fiddlers to the Fore
 The Flower of Portencross
 Hamish The Boot
 The Hardanger
 Hibiscus Two Step
 Hills of Bardi
 Home to Bon Accord
 John Mason's Compliments To The Rev. James Currie
 Keltic Odyssey
 Lament for the Death of Rev. Archie Beaton
 The Lairds Ferret
 Lord Elgin's Welcome
 The Old Man of Hoy
 The Orcadian
 Our Princess Royal
 Patrol
 The Rose of Galloway
 Scented Fairy Bower
 The Shetlander
 Silent Strings
 The Spirit Of Strathisla
 John Mason's Compliments To The Rev. James Currie
 Sunset Song (Afore the Grimleens)
 Wild Rose Of The Mountains
 Willie Kidd's Welcome to Orkney

References 

Scottish composers
Scottish solicitors
1940 births
2011 deaths